The Ashwood School is a historic school building at 5604 United States Route 220 in Hot Springs, Virginia.  It is a two-story brick building with a low-pitch hip roof and modest Classical Revival styling.  It was built about 1909, and served all grades until 1927, when a new high school was built.  It then served as an elementary school until its closure in 1969.  It served only white students in the racially segregated county school system until 1965, when court cases mandated its integration.

The building was listed on the National Register of Historic Places in 2016.

See also
National Register of Historic Places listings in Bath County, Virginia

References

School buildings on the National Register of Historic Places in Virginia
Colonial Revival architecture in Virginia
School buildings completed in 1909
Schools in Bath County, Virginia
National Register of Historic Places in Bath County, Virginia
1909 establishments in Virginia